Benjamin Eaton may refer to:

 Benjamin Harrison Eaton (1833–1904), Governor of Colorado
 Benjamin S. Eaton, land developer in Los Angeles County